Nanganallur Road metro station is a metro railway station on the Blue Line of the Chennai Metro. The station serves the neighbourhoods of Alandur, Nanganallur and St. Thomas Mount, among others.

Construction
The construction work of the station was awarded to URC Construction Company Private Limited, Erode.

The station
The station is located near Officers Training Academy where the stretch between the station and the Meenambakkam station dips below the ground for a brief distance to negotiate the air funnel area of the second runway of the airport.

Station layout

See also

 List of Chennai metro stations
 Chennai Metro
 Chennai International Airport

References

External links
Official Website for Chennai Metro Rail Limited

Chennai Metro stations
Railway stations in Chennai